Sister M. Madeleva Wolff, C.S.C., (May 24, 1887 – July 25, 1964), the "lady abbess of nun poets", was the third President of Saint Mary's College in Notre Dame, Indiana.

Life
Sister Madeleva was born in Cumberland, Wisconsin, in 1887, and christened Mary Evaline Wolff. Her father, August Wolff, was a Lutheran and a saddle and harness maker, who was twice mayor of Cumberland.  He read poetry to Mary Evaline.  Madeleva’s mother, Lucy, was a devout Catholic.  Mary Evaline learned how to handle pliers, tacks and hammers. She climbed thorn apple trees, diagrammed wildflowers and in winter ice-skated from morning to night.  At school, she "lived to learn, and so lived richly," she wrote in one of her books, My First Seventy Years.

Madeleva decided to become a religious sister during her first semester at Saint Mary's College. She was given the name "Madeleva" upon her acceptance into the Congregation of Holy Cross in 1908.

Sister Madeleva was known for her poetry, her eloquence and her outspokenness. She was a medieval scholar, whose literary essays won her distinction. She wrote a good deal in defense of Geoffrey Chaucer's character "The Prioress". In all, she authored more than 20 books.

She studied at numerous universities, including the University of California, Berkeley and University of Oxford. When she completed her M.A. degree in English at The University of Notre Dame, she had been one of only four Sisters to pursue graduate work there. In 1925, she earned a doctorate in English from the University of California at Berkeley. She served as a teacher and the principal of the Academy of the Sacred Heart (opened in 1878, the school closed in 1937) in Ogden, Utah, and as President of College of Saint Mary-of-the-Wasatch in Salt Lake City. She later became the head of the English department at Saint Mary's College.

The tenure of Sister Madeleva as President of Saint Mary's College began in 1934. She told leaders that "the essence of our college is not its buildings, its endowment fund, its enrollment, or even its faculty; the essence is the teaching of truth." Some of her most tangible contributions included the establishment of the School of Sacred Theology (the first and, for more than a decade, the only institution to offer graduate degrees in theology to women), the introduction of the Department of Nursing Education, and the construction of the Moreau Center for the Arts (named for Father Basil Moreau, it was one of the first all-purpose buildings for art studies—containing both galleries and theatres—in the country). In 1958, she received an honorary degree (LLD) from Indiana University. She retired from her position as president in 1961. She died in Boston in 1964.

Legacy 
The Academy of the Holy Cross has a Mandeleva Scholars Program.  It provides a structure for students who enter during their freshman year to achieve most fully the qualities of courage compassion and scholarship. 

Within St. Mary's College:

 The Madeleva Society, composed of benefactors of the college
 Madeleva Hall, a classroom building
 Sister Madeleva Poetry Society
 Madeleva Lecture Series

Madeleva Lecture Series 
The lecture series honors Sister Madeleva's establishment in 1943 of a School of Sacred Theology (since closed) that provided the first opportunity in the U.S. for women to pursue graduate studies in theology. The lecture series highlights the work of women in theology.  On April 29, 2009, the Feast of St. Catherine of Sienna, the 1985 - 2001 Madeleva lecturers jointly issued THE MADELEVA MANIFESTO: A Message of Hope and Courage directed at women in the church. (See External links below.)

Past Madeleva Lecturers 

 Monika K. Hellwig, 1985
 Sandra M. Schneiders, IHM, 1986
 Mary Collins, OSB, 1987
 Maria Harris, 1988
 Elizabeth Dreyer, 1989
 Joan Chittister, OSB, 1990
 Dolores Leckey, 1991
 Lisa Sowle Cahill, 1992
 Elizabeth A. Johnson, CSJ, 1993
 Gail Porter Mandell, 1994
 Diana L. Hayes, 1995
 Jeanette Rodriguez, 1996
 Mary C. Boys, SNJM, 1997
 Kathleen Norris, 1998
 Denise Lardner Carmody, 1999
 Sandra M. Schneiders, IHM, 2000
 Mary Catherine Hilkert, OP, 2001
 Margaret Farley, RSM, 2002
 Sidney Callahan, 2003
 Mary Ann Hinsdale, IHM, 2004
 Past Madeleva Lecturers on the 40th Anniversary of Vatican II, 2005
 Susan A. Ross, 2006
 M. Shawn Copeland, 2007
 Barbara Fiand, SNDdeN, 2008
 Anne E. Patrick, SNJM, 2009
 Wendy M. Wright, 2010
 Kwok Pui-Lan, 2011
 Kathleen Hughes, RSCJ, 2012
 Catherine E. Clifford, 2013
 Christine Firer Hinze, 2014
 Voices of Young Catholic Women, A Panel Discussion, 2015
 Marianne Farina, CSC, 2016
 Ilia Delio, OSF, 2017
 Mercy Amba Oduyoye, 2018
 Nancy Pineda-Madrid, 2019
 Lecture Postponed, 2020
 Barbara Reid, OP, 2021
 Lecture Canceled, 2022

Quotations
 "I like to go to Marshall Field's in Chicago just to see how many things there are in the world that I do not want."
 "Thinking of things to be done, hopes to be realized, persons to be helped, I say laughingly that I go to a multitude of funerals daily, burying so many deceased projects, so much of what I have had to let die and must bury without regret."

Literary works
 With Marian Anderson (?) co-written with Sister Mary Pieta
 Horizons: Reflections on a Liberal Education (1981?)
 A Child Asks for a Star (1964)
 The Sister Madeleva Story (1961) co-written with Barbara C. Jencks
 Conversations with Cassandra: Who Believes in Education? (1961)
 My First Seventy Years (1959)
 25 Poemas de la Hermana Mary Madeleva : En Versión Castellana (1959)
 The Four Last Things: Collected Poems (1959)
 American Twelfth Night, and Other Poems (1955)
 A Lost Language, and Other Essays on Chaucer (1951)
 The Education of Sister Lucy: A Symposium on Teacher Education and Teacher Training (1949)
 Collected Poems (1947)
 Saint Mary's College: Notre Dame, Holy Cross, Indiana : A Report of the President (1947)
 A Song of Bedlam Inn, and Other Poems (1946)
 Selected Poems (1945)
 Addressed to Youth (1944)
 New Things and Old, Christmas, 1941 (1941)
 Four Girls, and Other Poems (1941)
 Christmas Night 1940 (1940)
 Songs of the Rood; A Century of Verse (1940)
 Gates, and Other Poems (1938)
 Christmas Eve, and Other Poems (1938)
 Bethlehem (1938)
 A Question of Lovers, and Other Poems (1936)
 The Happy Christmas Wind, and Other Poems (1936)
 Penelope, and Other Poems (1927)
 Futility, (1926)  
 Chaucer's Nuns, and Other Essays (1925)
 Pearl; A Study in Spiritual Dryness (1924)
 Knights Errant, and Other Poems (1923)
 A Plea for the Familiar Essay in College English (1918)

Works inspired by Sister Madeleva
 Composer Zae Munn used Sister Madeleva's poetry as the text for a piece written for a women's choir titled "Touched to Apocalypse" (2001).
 Composer Elizabeth Poston used Sister Madeleva's poetry as text for a piece for voice and piano titled Sheepfolds. (1958)

References

Bibliography
 Hau, Sister Mary Eva - An Analysis of the Prose and Poetry of Sister Mary Madeleva ...
 Kilmer, Kenton - Contemporary Catholic Authors : Sister M. Madeleva, C.S.C., Pioneer Poet
 Klein, Mary Ellen - Sister M. Madeleva Wolff, C.S.C., Saint Mary's College, Notre Dame, Indiana : a study of presidential leadership, 1934-1961
 Mandell, Gail Porter - Madeleva: A Biography
 Mandell, Gail Porter - Madeleva: One Woman's Life
 McDonnell, Mary E. - A Study of Sister Madeleva's Disquisition on the Pearl in Regard to the Method She Followed and the Methods Followed by Earlier and Subsequent Writers.
 Oster, Ann M. - The Poetry of Sister Mary Madeleva, C.S.C. : A Spiritual Autobiography of a Modern Medievalist
 Quinn, Sister Mary Marcelline - Sister Mary Madeleva Wolff : A Study of Her Life and Works
 Werner, Maria Assunta - Madeleva: Sister Mary Madeleva Wolff, C.S.C. : A Pictorial Biography
 Witherspoon, Marjorie Hall Walsh - Sister Madeleva: Lyric Poet
 Life Magazine, June 10, 1957 - Close-up of Sister Mary Madeleva of Saint Mary's College in South Bend, Indiana

External links
 Biography - Sister Mary Madeleva
 Seton Hall University Records, Category Archives: Saint Mary’s College, Sister Mary Madeleva, CSC Collection
Women in American Religious History

THE MADELEVA MANIFESTO: A Message of Hope and Courage

Links to Sister Madeleva's poetry
 I Go to School
 Things to Be Loved
Three by Madeleva I: Poems by Sister M. Madeleva, C.S.C.
Three by Madeleva II: Poems by Sister M. Madeleva, C.S.C.
Three by Madeleva III: Poems by Sister M. Madeleva, C.S.C.
Three by Madeleva IV: Poems by Sister M. Madeleva, C.S.C.
Three by Madeleva V: Poems by Sister M. Madeleva, C.S.C.
Three by Madeleva VI: Poems by Sister M. Madeleva, C.S.C.

1887 births
1964 deaths
People from Cumberland, Wisconsin
Catholic poets
Congregation of Holy Cross
Saint Mary's College (Indiana) alumni
Saint Mary's College (Indiana) faculty
University of Southern California alumni
Writers from California
Writers from Indiana
Writers from Wisconsin
20th-century poets
20th-century American women writers
20th-century American Roman Catholic nuns
Catholics from Wisconsin
American women academics